The Very Best of Jackie Wilson is a 1987 greatest hits album by Jackie Wilson and was re-released in 1993.

Track listing
 "Reet Petite (The Finest Girl You Ever Want to Meet)" (Berry Gordy, Tyran Carlo) – 2:46
 "Lonely Teardrops" (Berry Gordy, Gwen Gordy Fuqua, Tyran Carlo) – 2:40
 "To Be Loved" (Berry Gordy, Gwen Gordy Fuqua, Tyran Carlo) – 2:30
 "That's Why (I Love You So)" (Berry Gordy, Gwen Gordy Fuqua, Tyran Carlo) – 2:05
 "I'll Be Satisfied" (Berry Gordy, Gwen Gordy Fuqua, Tyran Carlo) – 2:03
 "Doggin' Around" (Nat Tarnopol) – 2:48
 "Lonely Life"  – 2:28
 "Night" (Herb Miller, Johnny Lehmann) – 2:47
 "You Better Know It"  – 1:58
 "Talk That Talk"  – 2:14
 "Am I the Man" (Bob Hamilton, Tom King) – 2:34
 "I'm Comin' on Back to You"  – 2:15
 "A Woman, a Lover, a Friend"  – 2:32
 "Baby Workout" (Alonzo Tucker, Jackie Wilson) – 2:57
 "Squeeze Her - Tease Her (But Love Her)"  – 1:59
 "No Pity (In the Naked City)" (Alonzo Tucker, Jackie Wilson, Johnny Roberts) – 3:29
 "Whispers (Gettin' Louder)" (Barbara Acklin, David Scott) – 2:18
 "I Get the Sweetest Feeling"  – 2:53
 "Since You Showed Me How to Be Happy"  – 2:40
 "Love Is Funny That Way"  – 3:06
 "Just Be Sincere"  – 2:50
 "(Your Love Keeps Lifting Me) Higher and Higher"  – 2:57
 "You Got Me Walking"  – 2:39
 "(I Can Feel Those Vibrations) This Love Is Real"  – 2:52

References

1987 greatest hits albums
1993 greatest hits albums
Jackie Wilson albums
Compilation albums published posthumously